The Record-Courier may refer to one of these newspapers:

The Record-Courier (Nevada), Gardnerville, Nevada
The Record-Courier (Ohio), Portage County, Ohio
The Record-Courier (Baker City), Baker City, Oregon